The 2022 U Sports Men's Volleyball Championship was held March 25–27, 2022, in Winnipeg, Manitoba, to determine a national champion for the 2021–22 U Sports men's volleyball season. The third-seeded Alberta Golden Bears defeated the top-seeded Trinity Western Spartans in a re-match of the Canada West Championship game as the Golden Bears won the ninth national championship in program history.

Host
The tournament was played at Investors Group Athletic Centre at the University of Manitoba. This was the second time that Manitoba had hosted the tournament with the other occurring in 1978. Manitoba had previously been awarded the hosting duties for the 2020 championship, but that event was cancelled due to the COVID-19 pandemic in Canada.

Participating teams

Championship bracket

Bronze medal match

Gold medal match

Consolation bracket

Awards

Championship awards 
 Championship MVP – Jordan Canham, Alberta
 R.W. Pugh Fair Play Award – Manitoba Bisons

Mikasa Top Performers Presented by Nike Team 
Alberta: Jordan Canham
Trinity Western: Brodie Hofer

All-Star Team 
Jordan Canham, Alberta
Landon Currie, Alberta
Isaac Heslinga, Alberta
Derek Epp, Trinity Western
Brodie Hofer, Trinity Western
Julien Vanier, Sherbrooke
Hamish Hazelden, Calgary

References

External links 
 Tournament Web Site

U Sports volleyball
2022 in men's volleyball
University of Calgary